Probable G-protein coupled receptor 162 is a protein that in humans is encoded by the GPR162 gene.

This gene was identified upon genomic analysis of a gene-dense region at human chromosome 12p13. It appears to be mainly expressed in the brain; however, its function is not known. Alternatively spliced transcript variants encoding different isoforms have been identified.

References

Further reading

G protein-coupled receptors